The Philippine House Committee on Ways and Means, or House Ways and Means Committee is a standing committee of the Philippine House of Representatives.

Jurisdiction 
As prescribed by House Rules, the committee's jurisdiction is on the fiscal, monetary and financial affairs of the national government including tariff, taxation, revenues, borrowing, credit and bonded indebtedness.

Members, 18th Congress

See also 
 House of Representatives of the Philippines
 List of Philippine House of Representatives committees

References

External links 
House of Representatives of the Philippines

Ways and Means